The Tamworth Manifesto was a political manifesto issued by Sir Robert Peel in 1834 in Tamworth, which is widely credited by historians as having laid down the principles upon which the modern British Conservative Party is based.

In November 1834, King William IV removed the Whig Prime Minister Lord Melbourne and asked the Duke of Wellington to form a ministry. Wellington was reluctant and recommended that the King choose Peel.

Perhaps owing to Wellington's endorsement, Peel intended from the start, as the historian S. J. Lee tells, "to fully convince the country and electorate that there was a substantial difference between his brand of conservatism and that of his predecessor and 'old tory' Wellington."

With that in mind, on 18 December the Tamworth Manifesto was published by the press and read around the country. Like many other manifestos in nineteenth-century British politics it was formally an address to the electors of the leader's own constituency, but reproduced widely. In the event Tamworth saw no contest in January 1835: Peel and his brother William were the only candidates – they were elected, i.e. "returned", unopposed.

Peel's aims dictated in the Tamworth Manifesto

The main aim of the manifesto was to appeal to the electorate in the new Parliament.
 Peel accepted that the Reform Act 1832 was "a final and irrevocable settlement of a great constitutional question".
 He promised that the Conservatives would undertake a "careful review of institutions, civil and ecclesiastical".
 Where there was a case for change, he promised "the correction of proved abuses and the redress of real grievances".
 Peel offered to look at the question of church reform in order to preserve the "true interests of the Established religion".
 Peel's basic message, therefore, was that the Conservatives "would reform to survive".
 However, he opposed what he saw as unnecessary change, fearing "a perpetual vortex of agitation".

See also

 Antidisestablishmentarianism
 Catholic Emancipation Act of 1829
 High Church
 High Tory

Notes

Further reading
 Adelman, Paul. Peel and the Conservative Party, 1830-1850 (Longman, 1989)
 Gash, Norman. Sir Robert Peel: The Life of Sir Robert Peel after 1830 (1972).

External links
 The Tamworth Manifesto at Wikisource.

History of the Conservative Party (UK)
Political manifestos
Political history of the United Kingdom
1834 in politics
1834 in the United Kingdom
Party platforms
Robert Peel
December 1834 events
1834 documents
Tamworth, Staffordshire
Documents of the United Kingdom